Rick Cesari creates infomercials.  Under his direction his agency, Cesari Media, produced campaigns for OxiClean, George Foreman Grill, Sonicare, Rug Doctor, Eagle One, and for his own company, the Juiceman Juicer.

Biography
Rick Cesari, along with his older brother Steve and six siblings, was raised in suburban Westchester County, New York, United States.  After school and on weekends, he was expected to work in his father's grocery store.  Cesari earned a pre-medical degree before moving to the western United States to join a direct mail marketing partnership.  In 1989, Cesari and his brother Steve took out a home-equity loan on their mother's house to raise money to open their own business.

The new company was known as Trillium Health Products.  The company ran seminars on proper nutrition and also sold a juicer, known as the Juiceman, and a smaller version known as the Juiceman, Jr.  The Juiceman Juicer was marketed with direct marketing.  Its annual revenues in 1989 were $950,000 and had jumped to over $75 million by 1991.

In 1993, Cesari and his brother sold their company to Salton Inc., and Cesari created Cesari Media (formerly known as CRTV), which specializes in direct marketing.  Cesari Media produces infomercials, buys the media to display them, provides web development as well as SEM and SEO and manages back-end venders that are responsible for taking orders.  One of his first large deals was with Optiva (the makers of Sonicare), to market their electric toothbrushes.  Between 1994 and 1996, Optiva realized a 338% jump in sales.

Generally, 10% of direct marketing campaigns are successful, but as of 1997, Cesari Media had a 70% success rate.  Among their successful products are OxiClean, the George Foreman Grill, and the Sonicare Toothbrush.  "'The power of the infomercial is twofold', Cesari said. 'One, you have a whole half-hour to tell the story of the product as opposed to 30 seconds or 60 seconds. The second aspect is it basically creates a subsidized advertising program.'"

Current clients include the GoPro camera and Silk'n beauty products. Rick is the co-author of the book Buy Now published by Wiley in 2011. He launched the health and nutrition company Live Foods, Live Bodies in 2010 to market a line of appliances that are claimed to help people eat a healthier diet.

References

Living people
Direct marketing
Businesspeople from Seattle
Year of birth missing (living people)